The 2020–21 Hong Kong First Division League was the 7th season of Hong Kong First Division since it became the second-tier football league in Hong Kong in 2014–15. The season began on 22 November 2020 and ended on 20 June 2021.

Teams

Changes from last season

From First Division

Promoted to the Hong Kong Premier League
 Resources Capital

Withdrawn from the First Division
 King Fung

League table

References

Hong Kong First Division League seasons
2020–21 in Hong Kong football
Hong Kong